Justin R. Ishbia (born September 18, 1977) is an American billionaire and private equity investor, being a founding partner of Shore Capital Partners. He also joins his younger brother Mathew in being part of a new majority ownership for the Phoenix Suns of the National Basketball Association and Phoenix Mercury of the Women's National Basketball Association. He is also a minority owner of Major League Soccer team Nashville SC.

Biography
Ishbia was raised in a Jewish family in Birmingham, Michigan, a suburb of Detroit. He graduated with a B.A. from Michigan State University and a J.D. from Vanderbilt University School of Law. After school, he worked as an attorney. He is a founding partner in the Chicago-based private equity firm, Shore Capital Partners. 

In December 2022, he and his brother Mat Ishbia agreed to purchase the Phoenix Suns and the Phoenix Mercury from Robert Sarver for $4.0 billion. Justin's official role with the team has him taking on the alternate governor position for the team as well as being a significant investor in the organization. The deal to the Ishbia brothers was near-unanimously approved by the NBA on February 6, 2023, with the ownership change being made official on February 7, 2023.

He owns a 22% interest in United Wholesale Mortgage, a company founded by his father and now headed by his brother. Forbes lists his net worth as of April 2022 at $1.5 billion USD.

Philanthropy
In October 2021, Ishbia donated $10 million to his alma mater, Vanderbilt Law School. He had earlier established a scholarship fund at the school through a donation he made in 2015. In January 2022, Ishbia matched his brother Mat Ishbia's $1 million donation to Dick Vitale's charitable foundation supporting cancer research. "

References 

American billionaires
21st-century American businesspeople
Living people
National Basketball Association owners
Phoenix Mercury owners
Phoenix Suns owners
Year of birth missing (living people)
American people of Jewish descent